WISH-FM (98.9 FM) is a radio station licensed to Galatia, Illinois, United States. The station airs an adult contemporary format, and is owned by Dana Withers' Withers Broadcasting, through licensee WISH Radio, LLC.

References

External links
WISH-FM's website

ISH-FM
Mainstream adult contemporary radio stations in the United States
Radio stations established in 2001
2001 establishments in Illinois